The Grove Hill Courthouse Square Historic District is a historic district in Grove Hill, Alabama.  It is centered on the Clarke County Courthouse and the boundaries are roughly Cobb, Court, Jackson, and Main Streets.  It features examples of Greek Revival and Queen Anne architecture.  The district was added to the Alabama Register of Landmarks and Heritage on March 24, 1995, and to the National Register of Historic Places on April 30, 1998.

References

National Register of Historic Places in Clarke County, Alabama
Historic districts in Clarke County, Alabama
Properties on the Alabama Register of Landmarks and Heritage
Courthouses on the National Register of Historic Places in Alabama
County courthouses in Alabama
Greek Revival architecture in Alabama
Queen Anne architecture in Alabama
Historic districts on the National Register of Historic Places in Alabama